Canción de la nieve is a 1954 Argentine film.

Cast
 Guzzi Lantschner		
 Marisa Núñez		
 Cristina Pall		
 Elsa Trinner

External links

References

1954 films
1950s Spanish-language films
Argentine black-and-white films
Argentine musical drama films
1950s musical drama films
1950s Argentine films